Terry Melvin Sims (February 5, 1942 – February 23, 2000) was an American convicted murderer who was executed by the state of Florida for the murder of George Pfeil, a sheriff deputy who was killed during a robbery at the Longwood Village Pharmacy in Longwood, Florida, in 1977. Sims was executed in 2000 with the use of lethal injection, becoming the first inmate executed with that method in Florida, after the previous execution, which was conducted under the electric chair, had been seriously botched.

Crime 
On December 29, 1977, Sims along with three accomplices, James "B.B." Halsell, Curtis Baldree, and Clarence Eugene Robinson, committed a robbery at the Longwood Village Pharmacy in Longwood, Florida. Sims and Baldree entered the building, while Halsell and Robinson waited in the getaway car. Baldree went toward the back of the store to rob the pharmacist, while Sims watched the front door. They ordered the customers to enter the bathroom. 

At the same time, 57-year-old former U.S. Marine Corps soldier and World War II veteran George Pfeil, a retired New York City officer (1946–1973) and the Seminole County reserve deputy sheriff (1973–1977), entered the store. When he saw that the place was being robbed, Pfeil and Sims began exchanging gunfire at one another. Pfeil was shot twice, both wounds being fatal. Sims was shot once but managed to flee the scene. Sims fled the state of Florida not long after, taking refuge in California. There, in June 1978, he was arrested after a failed robbery.

Trial 
Sims was extradited to Florida to stand trial. At the trial, Halsell and Baldree testified that after Pfeil's murder, Sims bragged that he had "killed him with one bullet". Robinson was not present at the trial as he was not caught yet. In the end, Sims was found guilty of first degree murder and was sentenced to death. Baldree and Halsell were both convicted of their roles in the robbery and were both given two-year prison terms. Baldree and Halsell were eventually released, but were shot to death by Robinson in 1981 and 1982, respectively. Robinson's whereabouts were discovered and he was arrested on June 8, 1983, when he was identified for shooting and seriously wounding two FBI agents, Thomas Sobolewski and Dennis Wicklein, five days earlier.

Execution 
In 1999, convicted killer Allen Lee Davis was executed in Florida by the routine method of the electric chair. During his execution, blood began rapidly pouring out of his nose, and witnesses reported that Davis was still alive after the electrocution stopped. The execution was considered by some to have been botched, and this prompted the United States Supreme Court to challenge the use of Florida's electric chair, temporarily halting all executions in the state.  By this time, other U.S. states had converted their execution method to lethal injection, and Florida soon also decided to change its method.

Sims, who had spent over 20-years on death row, was scheduled to be executed on November 2, 1999. However, a judge awarded Sims a stay of execution, rescheduling it to February 23 the next year. A week before his scheduled execution, Sims challenged the use of lethal injection, but his appeals were denied. On February 23, Sims was executed with the injection method, becoming the first person to be executed with it in Florida. His final words were "I love my family. I love all my friends and my rabbi". Since his execution, all other executions in Florida have been performed by lethal injection, although inmates can still choose to be executed by the electric chair.

See also 
 Capital punishment in Florida
 Capital punishment in the United States
 List of people executed by lethal injection
 List of people executed in Florida
 List of people executed in the United States in 2000

References 

1942 births
2000 deaths
1977 murders in the United States
20th-century executions by Florida
20th-century executions of American people
American male criminals
American robbers
Executed people from Florida
Male murderers
People convicted of murder by Florida
People executed by Florida by lethal injection